Osage Mission's post was located at the Osage Catholic Mission, which was established in 1847. Eventually, Osage Mission became the town of St. Paul, Kansas, inside what would become Neosho County, Kansas. Indian Territory eventually became the state of Oklahoma. When the Civil War erupted, Father John Schoenmakers wanted to keep the Mission as neutral ground and thus out of the conflict. Although at one point Schoenmakers had to flee for a time, he pretty much succeeded in keeping Osage Mission itself out of harm's way.

Both Union and Confederate troops operated in the area surrounding Osage Mission and at times troops from both sides entered it. At times from 1862 to 1865 Union troops were stationed at Osage Mission, almost certainly on its outskirts. The first time troops were mentioned at the Mission was in a military report on Dec. 16, 1862. The troops left at some point and by October 1863 Union troops were back, when Confederate guerrillas were at the Mission for a time.

In November 1863 Confederates entered the Mission and the small force there, under a sergeant, was powerless to effectively drive them off. A company of Union troops was called in and drove them off. It appears that a larger body of troops were posted to the Mission, probably permanently until the post was deactivated in June 1865.

References

Forts in Kansas
Neosho County, Kansas
United States Army posts
1862 establishments in Kansas